Christian and Emma Herr Farm is a historic farm and national historic district located at West Lampeter Township, Lancaster County, Pennsylvania. The district includes six contributing buildings.  They are a brick farmhouse, a stone end barn (1761), a frame tobacco barn (1907), a frame summer kitchen (c. 1890), a tenant house (1864), and a frame shed (1900-1920).  The farmhouse was built in 1867, and is a 2 1/2-story, five bay by two bay, brick dwelling.  It has a recessed three bay by two bay east wing, and a full-width front porch.  The summer kitchen is attached to the wing.

It was listed on the National Register of Historic Places in 1994.

References

Farms on the National Register of Historic Places in Pennsylvania
Historic districts on the National Register of Historic Places in Pennsylvania
Infrastructure completed in 1761
Houses completed in 1864
Houses completed in 1867
Infrastructure completed in 1907
Houses in Lancaster County, Pennsylvania
National Register of Historic Places in Lancaster County, Pennsylvania